John Quayle, (1725–1797) was a Manx lawyer who became the Clerk of the Rolls in the Isle of Man.

Biography
John Quayle was born in the Isle of Man in 1725, the son of John Quayle and Elizabeth (née Harrison). He married Margaret Moore, daughter of Sir George Moore in 1750: the marriage produced eight children.

Part of a Manx legal dynasty, Quayle became Clerk of the Rolls in 1755 following the death of his father. His duties including the keeping of the public records of the Island, and taking evidence in special cases heard before the Manx Chancery Court. Quayle was offered a knighthood in 1781, however he declined the offer.

John Quayle died in 1797. He was succeeded as Clerk of the Rolls by his son, Mark Quayle

References

1725 births
1797 deaths
Manx judges